Exmilitary, also known as Ex Military, is the debut mixtape by experimental hip hop group Death Grips. It was released for free on April 25, 2011, through the band's website.

Background 
The mixtape was released for free on April 25, 2011, through the group's official website, thirdworlds.net, and later appeared on the net label Grindcore Karaoke. It was simultaneously released through iTunes. The track "Guillotine" was released through iTunes on August 3, 2011. "Guillotine" has become one of the band's most recognized songs, with more than fourteen million YouTube views on their music video as of October 28, 2022. Other tracks released as music videos include "Known for it", "Culture Shock", "Lord of the Game", "Spread Eagle Cross the Block", "Takyon (Death Yon)", and "Beware". According to Andy Morin, the cover art "[is a] photograph that one of our members carried in their wallet for roughly 10 years straight. It’s a power object." The photo was eventually identified as "Bearded Man at Oenpelli", taken by Douglass Baglin in 1968 for his book "The Dark Australians" by him and David R. Moore.

The mixtape was later released exclusively through the band's website in vinyl, compact disc and cassette formats.

Critical reception 

The mixtape has received universal acclaim from critics. On Metacritic it has a score of 82 out of 100 based on reviews from 7 critics. 
In one very positive review, John Calvert of Drowned in Sound focused on the mentality of the character that the album revolves around and how it reflects the inner nature of man, citing the lyricism and sound production as being focal points around this sound and style. Nate Patrin of Pitchfork gave Exmilitary a 7.5, describing the mixtape as "a bludgeoning slab of hostility" that avoids being an "overbearing mess".

Black Google 
On September 8, 2011, the group released a teaser video for an upcoming project titled Black Google. It was later released on the band's website for free and revealed to be all of the instrumentals, stems, and acapellas for fans to remix and record with. The cover of Black Google features a heavily darkened version of the cover of Exmilitary with the word "Exmilitary" replaced with "Black Google". Black Google, for the band itself, is a "portal to the deconstruction of Exmilitary."

Track listing

Sample credits 
 "Beware" contains excerpts of Charles Manson's "I Make The Money Man" interview, samples of "Up The Beach", written and performed by Jane's Addiction and samples of "God Is Watching You", performed by Dickie Burton.
 "Spread Eagle Cross the Block" contains elements of "Rumble", written by Link Wray and Milt Grant, and performed by Link Wray and His Men, and samples of "(You Gotta) Fight for Your Right (To Party!)" and "Girls", written and performed by Beastie Boys.
"Lord of the Game" contains samples of "The Ditty", performed by Blue Devils, a sample of "Brass Monkey", written and performed by Beastie Boys, and a vocal sample of "Fire", written and performed by The Crazy World of Arthur Brown.
 "Takyon (Death Yon)" contains samples of "The Ditty", performed by Blue Devils, a sample of "Supertouch / Shitfit", written and performed by Bad Brains and a sample of "A Who Seh Me Dun", written and performed by Cutty Ranks.
 "Cut Throat (Instrumental)" contains samples of "Move Somethin'", written and performed by 2 Live Crew and samples of "Death Grips (Next Grips)" written and performed by Death Grips.
 "Klink" contains elements of "Rise Above" written and performed by Black Flag and a sample of "Liar Liar", written and performed by The Castaways.
 "Culture Shock" contains a sample of "The Supermen (Alternative)", written and performed by David Bowie and samples of a text to speech translator.
 "5D" contains samples of a text to speech translator and samples of "West End Girls", written and performed by Pet Shop Boys.
 "Thru The Walls" contains elements taken from the movie "Space Is the Place", a sample of a YouTube video "Mental Health Hotline", a sample of "Gettin' High In The Mornin'", written and performed by Ariel Pink and the Haunted Graffiti, and took the sounds of a "Combine Soldier" from video game "Half-Life 2".
 "Known for It" contains elements taken from the 1986 short animated film "Quest: A Long Ray's Journey Into Light" and samples of "De Futura", written and performed by Magma.
 "I Want It I Need It (Death Heated)" contains elements of "Interstellar Overdrive" and "Astronomy Domine", both written and performed by Pink Floyd.

Personnel
Death Grips
 MC Ride – vocals
 Zach Hill – drums, percussion, production
 Andy Morin – keyboards, programming, production

References

External links
 

2011 mixtape albums
Self-released albums
Death Grips albums
Albums free for download by copyright owner
Rap rock albums by American artists
Mixtape albums